The forms of address in Chile were established by the Ministry of Foreign Affairs and refer to other various laws on the matter. In practice, the correct forms of address are reserved for the most formal documents, as is the case with current President of the lower chamber of Congress, who is normally addressed as simply 'Señor Diego Paulsen Kehr', without the styles of Excellency and Honourable which he is entitled to.

Executive

Legislature

Judiciary

Regional government

Local government

Armed Forces

Other

Notes

References 

Chile
Chile